AerCap Holdings N.V. is an American-Irish aviation leasing company headquartered in Dublin, Ireland, with offices around the world. AerCap is listed on the NYSE 'AER'. It became the largest aviation leasing company in the world following the acquisition of International Lease Finance Corporation (ILFC) in 2014, and GECAS from General Electric in 2021. Its assets include wide-body aircraft, regional jets, cargo aircraft, aircraft engines, and helicopters.
General Electric owns 45.4% of the company.

Business

Portfolio
As of December 31, 2021, it had 3,701 aircraft, engines and helicopters owned, on order or managed, including 1,756 owned aircraft, 196 managed aircraft, 417 new aircraft on order, with a weighted average age of 7.1 years, and over 900 owned and managed aircraft engines, primarily manufactured by General Electric and CFM International. Through Milestone Aviation Group, its subsidiary, it owns 355 helicopters.

The company is one of the largest purchasers of aircraft from Boeing, Airbus, and Embraer and one of the largest purchasers of aircraft engines from CFM International, GE Aviation, International Aero Engines, Pratt & Whitney, and Rolls-Royce.

Customers
Its helicopters are leased to companies including CHC Helicopter, Bristow Helicopters, Saudi Aramco, and Babcock International. The company's cargo division serves customers including Amazon, Maersk, and ASL Airlines Ireland. The company leases aircraft primarily via operating leases under which the lessee is responsible for the maintenance and servicing of the equipment during the lease term and the company receives the residual value of the equipment at the end of the lease. The company serves over 300 customers in 80 countries.

In 2021, its largest customers based on percentage of revenue were American Airlines (7.6% of 2021 revenues), China Southern Airlines (7.1% of 2021 revenues), Air France (4.9% of 2021 revenues), Azul Brazilian Airlines (4.7% of 2021 revenues), and Ethiopian Airlines (3.2% of 2021 revenues).

Locations
It has its headquarters in Dublin, and offices in Shannon, Miami, Singapore, Amsterdam, Shanghai and Abu Dhabi. It also has representative offices near the headquarters of largest aircraft manufacturers: Boeing in Seattle and Airbus in Toulouse.

History
Aercap traces its history to Guinness Peat Aviation, founded in 1975 by Tony Ryan. In 1998, it became AERFI after a bailout from Texas Pacific Group. In 2000, it was acquired by Debis AirFinance, owned by Daimler Chrysler, for $750 million.

In 2005, Debis AirFinance was acquired by affiliates of Cerberus Capital Management, which formed AerCap. 
In 2006, the company set up AerVenture, a 50/50 joint venture with LoadAir/Al Fawares. In 2009, after its partners refused to fund a capital contribution, Waha Capital acquired their 50% stake and became partners with AerCap.

In January 2007, the company became a public company via an initial public offering.
In March 2010, the company acquired Genesis Lease.
By 2013, the affiliates of Cerberus sold substantially all of their shares in the company.

ILFC acquisition 
In May 2014, the company acquired International Lease Finance Corporation from American International Group (AIG) for $3.0 billion of cash and $4.6 billion in stock.
The deal gave AerCap $43 billion in total assets and a fleet of over 1,300 aircraft, compared to competitor GE Capital Aviation Services with a fleet of 1,800+ aircraft.

In January 2015, the company shifted assets to Ireland.
In June 2015, AerCap signed an agreement with Boeing for an order of 100 Boeing 737 MAX 8 aircraft with deliveries starting in 2019.
In June 2015, AIG sold about 71.2 million shares in a public offering and AerCap purchased an additional 15.7 million of its shares from AIG.
In August 2015, AIG completed its departure from the airplane-leasing business with the sale of the additional 10.7 million shares.

By the end of 2015, AerCap's portfolio consisted of 1,697 aircraft that were owned, on order, under contract or managed (including aircraft owned by AerDragon, a non-consolidated joint venture). The average age of the owned fleet as of December 31, 2015 was 7.7 years and the average remaining contracted lease term was 5.9 years. In 2015, AerCap leased, purchased and sold 405 aircraft. The company signed lease agreements for 276 aircraft and purchased 46 new aircraft. AerCap executed sale and part-out transactions for 83 aircraft and signed financing transactions for US$7.3 billion.

In February 2016, AerCap reported record 2015 financial results and authorized a share repurchase program of $400 million.
In 2016, AerCap signed lease agreements for 279 aircraft, purchased 38 and sold 141 aircraft, and signed financing transactions for $4.6 billion; as of December 31, 2016, it has 1,566 owned, managed or on order aircraft in its portfolio.

In June 2017, Aercap placed an order for 30 Boeing 787-9s, valued at $8.1 billion at list prices at the Paris Air Show.
AerCap announced on 28 December that it exercised options to purchase 50 A320neo Family aircraft to be delivered from 2022, bringing its  A320neo Family portfolio to 270 owned and on order.
In March 2021, AerCap signed a deal with start-up long-haul, low-cost airline Norse Atlantic Airways, for the lease of six used Boeing 787-9s and three used Boeing 787-8 aircraft.

GECAS acquisition
In March 2021, Aercap announced they had reached a deal to acquire GE Capital Aviation Services (GECAS) from General Electric for US$24 billion in cash, US$1 billion of AerCap notes and approximately 46% of the combined business in shares. The acquisition was approved by AerCap shareholders in May 2021.
In November, the company completed the acquisition for 111.5 million AerCap shares, approximately $23 billion of cash and $1 billion of AerCap notes.
In 2022, the company moved its U.S. headquarters from Los Angeles to Miami.

2022 Russian invasion of Ukraine 
The company was negatively affected by the 2022 Russian invasion of Ukraine and the international sanctions that followed. At the beginning of the invasion, it had 152 aircraft valued at $2.5 billion in Russia and Ukraine, which foreign companies were unable to recover or service. In May 2022, the company reported a net loss of $2 billion due to the seizure of its planes and engines by the Russian authorities. 113 of its planes were seized in response to sanctions triggered by the war in Ukraine.

References

External links
 

2006 establishments in Ireland
2007 initial public offerings
Aircraft leasing companies of the Republic of Ireland
Companies based in Dublin (city)
Companies listed on the New York Stock Exchange
St Stephen's Green
Transport companies established in 1995